The 2005–06 National Division Three South was the sixth season (19th overall) of the fourth division (south) of the English domestic rugby union competition using the name National Division Three South.  New teams to the division included Bracknell and Rosslyn Park who were relegated from 2004–05 National Division Two while Cambridge came up as champions of London Division 1 along with Cinderford (champions) and Bridgwater & Albion (playoffs) who were promoted from South West Division 1.  The league system was 4 points for a win, 2 points for a draw and additional bonus points being awarded for scoring 4 or more tries and/or losing within 7 points of the victorious team.  In terms of promotion the league champions would go straight up into National Division Two while the runners up would have a one-game playoff against the runners up from National Division Three North (at the home ground of the club with the superior league record) for the final promotion place.

At the end of the season Cambridge made it two successive promotions in a row, finishing league champions just 2 points ahead of runners up North Walsham (who actually beat them home and away) and gaining promotion to the 2006–07 National Division Two.  North Walsham were unable to join Cambridge in National Division Two as they lost their promotion playoff at home to the 2005–06 National Division Three North runners up Nuneaton.  At the other end of the table, Bracknell were the first side to be relegated, going down for the second year in a row with just two wins all season. They were followed by Reading who were more competitive but still two wins off the 12th placed team Old Patesians.  Both Reading and Bracknell would drop down to South West Division 1.

Participating teams and locations

Final league table

Results

Round 1

Round 2

Round 3

Round 4

Round 5

Round 6

Round 7 

Postponed.  Game rescheduled to 4 February 2006.

Postponed.  Game rescheduled to 4 February 2006.

Postponed.  Game rescheduled to 4 February 2006.

Round 8

Round 9

Round 10 

Postponed.  Game rescheduled to 18 March 2006.

Round 11

Round 12

Round 13

Round 14

Round 15

Round 16

Round 17

Round 7 (rescheduled games) 

Game rescheduled from 5 November 2005.

Game rescheduled from 5 November 2005.

Game rescheduled from 5 November 2005.

Round 18

Round 19

Round 20

Round 21

Round 22 

Postponed.  Game rescheduled to 18 March 2006.

Postponed.  Game rescheduled to 18 March 2006.

Rounds 10 & 22 (rescheduled games) 

Game rescheduled from 11 March 2006.

Game rescheduled from 11 March 2006.

Game rescheduled from 26 November 2005.

Round 23

Round 24

Round 25

Round 26

Promotion play-off
The league runners up of National Division Three South and North would meet in a playoff game for promotion to National Division Two.  North Walsham were the southern division runners up and as they had a superior league record than northern runners-up, Nuneaton, they hosted the play-off match.

Total season attendances 

Does not include promotion playoff game.

Individual statistics 

 Note that points scorers includes tries as well as conversions, penalties and drop goals.

Top points scorers

Top try scorers

Season records

Team
Largest home win — 71 pts
71 - 0 Bridgwater & Albion at home to Cinderford on 4 March 2006
Largest away win — 42 pts
47 - 5 North Walsham away to Bracknell on 28 January 2006
Most points scored — 75 pts 
75 - 14 Bridgwater & Albion at home to Bracknell on 1 April 2006
Most tries in a match — 13
Bridgwater & Albion at home to Bracknell on 1 April 2006
Most conversions in a match — 8 (x3)
North Walsham at home to Bracknell on 22 October 2005
Cambridge at home to Cinderford on 5 November 2005
Bridgwater & Albion at home to Cinderford on 4 March 2006
Most penalties in a match — 6
Lydney at home to Bridgwater & Albion on 24 September 2005
Most drop goals in a match — 2
Rosslyn Park at home to Westcombe Park on 11 February 2006

Player
Most points in a match — 25
 Andy Frost for Southend at home to Hertford on 1 April 2006
Most tries in a match — 4 (x3)
 Altus Laubscher for Cambridge at home to Hertford on 11 February 2006
 Mike Griffiths for Bridgwater & Albion at home to Cinderford on 4 March 2006
 Adam Roberts for Hertford at home to Cinderford on 8 April 2006
Most conversions in a match — 8
 Andrew Dickson for North Walsham at home to Bracknell on 22 October 2005
Most penalties in a match — 6
 Adam Westall for Lydney at home to Bridgwater & Albion on 24 September 2005
Most drop goals in a match — 2
 Richard Mahony for Rosslyn Park at home to Westcombe Park on 11 February 2006

Attendances
Highest — 1,150 
Cambridge at home to North Walsham on 11 March 2006
Lowest — 40 
Old Patesians at home to Southend on 7 January 2006
Highest Average Attendance — 682
Bridgwater & Albion
Lowest Average Attendance — 119 (x2)
Old Patesians and Reading

See also
 English rugby union system
 Rugby union in England

References

External links
 NCA Rugby

2005–06
2005–06 in English rugby union leagues